Panasia Island is an island in Papua New Guinea, part of the Calvados Chain within the Louisiade Archipelago. It is located at the western end of the Calvados Chain, in the Louisiade Archipelago, in the Milne Bay Province, next to Pana Varavara.
Utian islanders use this island for gardening yams.

References

Islands of Milne Bay Province
Louisiade Archipelago
Uninhabited islands of Papua New Guinea